The Outcast is a 1934 British comedy crime film directed by Norman Lee and starring Leslie Fuller, Mary Glynne and Hal Gordon. It was produced by British International Pictures at the company's Welwyn Studios. The film's sets were designed by the art director John Mead.

Synopsis
The plot concerns a travelling theatre troupe who have to take up gambling to make a living.

Cast
 Leslie Fuller as Bill Potter 
 Mary Glynne as Eve Baxter 
 Hal Gordon as  Jim Truman 
 Jane Carr as Nancy Acton 
 Wallace Geoffrey as Ted Morton 
 Gladdy Sewell as May Truman 
 Patrick Aherne as Burke 
 Jimmy Godden as Harry

References

Bibliography
Low, Rachael. Filmmaking in 1930s Britain. George Allen & Unwin, 1985.
Wood, Linda. British Films, 1927-1939. British Film Institute, 1986.

External links

1934 films
British crime comedy films
Films directed by Norman Lee
1930s crime comedy films
British black-and-white films
1934 comedy films
Films shot at British International Pictures Studios
Films shot at Welwyn Studios
1930s English-language films
1930s British films